Ciuflea Monastery is a Moldovan Orthodox monastery located in Chișinău, Moldova. It is dedicated to Saint Theodore of Amasea.

History

The monastery was financed by Anastasie Ciufli (1801 - 1870) to respect the last will of his brother Teodor Ciufli (1796 - 1854).
The two brothers were Aromanian merchants who emigrated from Macedonia to Bessarabia in 1821.
Anastasie was authorised to start the construction of the church for his brother in 1854, it was finally consecrated on June 6, 1858. Teodor's remains were placed in the south wing of the building, his brother eventually joined him in their final resting place after his own death 11 years later.

In 1962, many churches of the Moldavian SSR were closed or their purpose changed. The main church of Chișinău, the Nativity Cathedral suffered the same fate by being transformed into an exhibition building. Thus the head of Moldova Church had to be moved to the then monastery of Ciuflea, which was granted of the status of cathedral and renamed according to its benefactor. In 2002, about a decade after the breakup of the Soviet Union, it became a monastery.

Sources

 Catedrala episcopală Sf. Teodor Tiron

Gallery

Former cathedrals
Christian monasteries in Moldova
Churches completed in 1858
Buildings and structures in Chișinău